Ole Irgens (22 January 1724—15 October 1803) was a priest and theologian.  He was a bishop in the Church of Norway from 1779–1803.

Irgens was born in Surendal in Møre og Romsdal county, Norway, to vicar Johannes Irgens. He enrolled as a student in 1741, but was examined two years later and was hired as chaplain under his father. He left in 1756 to become a ship's priest in Morocco, but citing health problems, he returned to Norway in 1760 to become vicar in Faaberg. In 1773 he was promoted to vicar in the Nidaros Cathedral and (at the same time) he was also the diocesan dean (stiftsprovst) in the Diocese of Nidaros. He served as vice praeses of the Royal Norwegian Society of Sciences and Letters from 1773 to 1780.

In 1779 Irgens took a doctorate with the thesis De spiritu oris Jehovae creante, ps. 33. v. 6. The same year he was appointed bishop of the Diocese of Bjørgvin. He held this post until his death in 1803, having been blind for the last five years of his life. Many of his publications and speeches have been preserved.

References

1724 births
1803 deaths
Bishops of Bjørgvin
Norwegian blind people
People from Møre og Romsdal
18th-century Norwegian clergy
Royal Norwegian Society of Sciences and Letters